Eppihus is a genus of moths of the family Tortricidae.

Species
Eppihus hippeus Razowski, 2006

Etymology
The genus name is an anagram of the name of type-species of this genus.

See also
List of Tortricidae genera

References

 , 2006, Acta Zoologica Cracoviensia 49B (1-2): 115-135

External links
tortricidae.com

Olethreutini
Tortricidae genera
Taxa named by Józef Razowski